The Paterson Police Department is the primary law enforcement agency for the city of Paterson, New Jersey. It has about 400 sworn law enforcement officers and 125 support staff. It is the largest accredited police  department in the state. Its director is Jerry Speziale.

History

The department began operations on August 1, 1866. Before then, the city was protected by a city marshal and five watchmen, one for each ward.

Eight Paterson policemen have died in the line of duty.

In April 2011, 125 officers, described as "a quarter of the officers" were laid off due to budget problems.

In February 2020, the City Council approved an outside audit of the police department following the arrest of an eighth officer involved in a corruption scandal and the death of an arrestee.

Organization

 Patrol Command
 Narcotics, Vice Bureau Command, ABC Investigations
 Major Crimes, Juvenile, Domestic Crimes, Meghan's Law  
 Internal Affairs Division 
 Administrative Services Bureau 
 Community Policing
 Specialized Investigation Division
 Special Operations Unit/Emergency Response Team
 Records Division
 Traffic

See also
Paterson Fire Department

References

Municipal police departments of New Jersey
Paterson, New Jersey